Lords Lev of Rosental was a Bohemian noble family. They named themselves after the town Rožmitál pod Třemšínem. They held the castles Rožmitál, Blatná and Buzice.

History
This family came of an ancient and noble Buzici clan – boyars, members of higher Slavic nobility. Omeljan Pritsak concluded in research about the Attila clan of the Hunnic Empire that the religious suffix ‘sig’ when combined with Hunnic ‘Buz’ would mean “Wild Boar like-man”, a symbol in the family emblem. In addition she thinks that the movement of the Slavs in Europe is accompanied under the leadership of the ruling class of Huns, whose language is gradually melted into Slavonic.

Greatest power has the family in the 15th century. In the days of King George of Poděbrady, of King Vladislaus II of Hungary and his successor King Louis II of Hungary, they was one of the most influential family in the Kingdom of Bohemia. The last effort to keep the power of the family was the marriage between the grandson of Queen Joanna of Rožmitál, Adam I of Hradec, with the grand daughter of Jaroslav Lev of Rožmitál, Anna of Rožmitál and Blatná.

Gradually the family lost their power, moved to Moravia and finally became part of the stock that emigrated to Poland after the Battle of White Mountain and the events in 1626.

Coat of arms
A shield divided by a cross. In the first and third quadrant are golden lions, in the second and fourth quadrant golden heads of wild boar.

Further reading 
“The Travels of Leo of Rozmital through Germany, Flanders England, France Spain, Portugal and Italy” 1465-1467. Contributors: Malcolm Letts - author. Publisher: Published for the Hakluyt Society at the University Press. Place of Publication: Cambridge, England. Publication Year: 1957.
“Gentlemen Errant” The Bohemian Ulysses, by Mrs. Henry Cust, London 1909.
“Tractatus pacis generalis toti christianitati fiendae” Deutsche Übersetzung von Messler, G. In Das Weltfriedensmanifest König Georgs von Podiebrad. Kirnbach über Wolfach : Johannes Mathesius-Verlag, 1973, s. 37 - 49.
“Who is Vladislav Varnenchik” - Emilia Petkova and Eva Racheva - Park - Museum Vladislav Varnenchik
“The Hunnic Languages of the Attila Clan” - Omeljan Pritsak - Cambridge study. Publication Year: 1982
“ИСТОРИЯ ПАПСТВА” - “ВНЕШНЯЯ ПОЛИТИКА ПАПСТВА В КОНЦЕ XVI - ПЕРВОЙ ПОЛОВИНЕ XVII в.” С. Г. ЛОЗИНСКИЙ

Bohemian noble families